The mouth is the orifice through which an organism intakes food. 

Mouth may also refer to:

 River mouth, the source or terminus of a water body
 "Mouth" (Merril Bainbridge song), 1995
 "Mouth" (Bush song), 1996
 Mouth series, a collection of mashup albums by Neil Cicierega
 Mouth (hieroglyph), an Egyptian language symbol
 Mouth, a type of vertex in mathematics
 Mike Matusow (born 1968), professional poker player nicknamed "the Mouth"
 Half of the Dutch pop duo Mouth and MacNeal
 Marvin "Mouth" McFadden, a character in the TV series One Tree Hill
 Mouth of Sauron, a character in J. R. R. Tolkien's Middle-earth legendarium

See also 
 Sigurd II of Norway (1133–1155), king of Norway whose epithet, Munn, means "the Mouth" in Old Norse